Maggie Anderson (born Margarita; born 1971) is an American activist, author, CEO, and co-founder, with her husband John Anderson, of the Empowerment Experiment.

Biography
Anderson grew up in Liberty City, Miami, Florida and earned degrees at Emory University and University of Chicago. Her husband, John Anderson, is from Detroit, went to Harvard, and earned his MBA at Kellogg School of Management. They conceived the project after an expensive dinner at the posh Tru restaurant on Chicago's Magnificent Mile.

Anderson studied constitutional law under Barack Obama at Chicago Law School. She was an executive at McDonald's.

Anderson and her family spent the entire year of 2009 patronizing, as much as possible, only African-American owned businesses, eschewing all others. She wrote a book about the experience, reporting that in some fields, it was difficult to find black-owned businesses, and that black people patronized businesses within their own ethnic group less than other ethnic groups.

Anderson has participated in successful political campaigns for Rep. John Lewis, Mayor of Atlanta Bill Campbell, and Barack Obama's campaign for U.S. Senate. She has done work for the RainbowPUSH Coalition.

Books
In 2012, Anderson published her first book Our Black Year: One Family's Quest to Buy Black in America's Racially Divided Economy, which she co-authored with Ted Gregory, a Pulitzer Prize-winning journalist at the Chicago Tribune. The book describes the struggle she and her family went through with racism in business professions.

Anderson has also written the following romance fiction novels:
A Night of Passion (2015)
Driving Me Crazy (2016)
Wolf Blood (2017)
Wolf Curse (2017)
Christmas, Mistletoe and You (2017)
Wolf Lover (2019)
Wolf Bonds (2021)

See also
African-American businesses
Black Economic Empowerment

References

External links
 (video)

 

Date of birth missing (living people)
1971 births
African-American activists
African-American businesspeople
African-American women in business
Businesspeople from Miami
Emory University alumni
University of Chicago Booth School of Business alumni
University of Chicago Law School alumni
Businesspeople from Chicago
McDonald's people
Living people
American women chief executives
21st-century American businesspeople
21st-century African-American people
21st-century African-American women
20th-century African-American people
20th-century African-American women